Šara may refer to:
Šara (mountain), or Shar, a mountain range on the Balkan peninsula
Shara (god) (Šara), a deity in Sumerian mythology

See also 
Shara (disambiguation)
Sara (disambiguation)